Scarborough station may refer to:

 Scarborough (Metro-North station), in Scarborough, New York, USA
 Scarborough Centre station, light rail station in Scarborough, Ontario, Canada
 Scarborough GO Station, in Scarborough, Ontario, Canada
 Scarborough railway station, in Scarborough, North Yorkshire, UK
 Scarborough railway station, New South Wales, in Scarborough, New South Wales, Australia

See also
 Scarborough (disambiguation)